Siddana Konduru is a famous village in Nellore district, Andhra Pradesh, India. Famous for lord Shiva temple. Biggest temple in the state. Shivaratri festival will celebrate here.

References

Villages in Nellore district